The 2004 Stroud Council election took place on 10 June 2004 to elect members of Stroud District Council in Gloucestershire, England. One third of the council was up for election and the Conservative Party stayed in overall control of the council.

After the election, the composition of the council was:
Conservative 27
Labour 11
Liberal Democrat 6
Green 4
Independent 3

Election result

Ward results

References

2004 English local elections
2004
2000s in Gloucestershire